Kunjandi  (1919–2002) was an Indian actor in Malayalam cinema. He has acted in more than 50 films. He handled character roles as well as supporting roles.

Background
Kunjandi was born at Calicut. His first movie was Swargaraajyam in 1962. He was very active during the 1970s and 1980s. He died on 6 January 2002. He was 83. He was given the Kerala Sangeetha Nataka Academi Award in 1992. He also won the Pushpasree Trust Award in 1993 and Ramashram Award in 1999. He received the Kerala Sangeetha Nataka Akademi Award in 1977 and the Kerala Sangeetha Nataka Akademi Fellowship in 1999.

Filmography

 Sidhartha (1998)
 Vismayam (1998)
 The Truth (1998)
 Asuravamsam (1997)
 Kalyaana Unnikal (1997)
 Kalyaanakkacheri (1997)
 April 19 (1996)
 Kaanchanam (1996)
 Vanarasena (1996)
 Kidilolkkidilam (1995)
 No. 1 Snehatheeram Bangalore North (1995)
 Thumboli Kadappuram (1995)
 Gamanam (1994)
 Yaadhavam (1993)
 Adhwaytham (1992)
 Aamina Tailors (1991) as Moidukka
 Kadavu (1991)
 Kadathanadan Ambadi(1990)as Kandacheri Chappan
 Brahmarakshassu (1990)
 Aye Auto (1990)
 Malootty (1990)
 Maalayogam (1990)
 Mahayanam (1989)
 Dhwani (1988)
 Vellanakalude Nadu (1988) 
 Kanakambarangal (1988) at Gopalan master
 Marikkunnilla Njaan (1988)
 Oridathu (1987) asThomachan
 Vrutham (1987)
 Amrutham Gamaya (1987)
 Arappatta Kettiya Gramathil (1986)
 Malamukalile Daivam (1986)
 Doore Doore Oru Koodu Koottam (1986)
 Vartha (1986)
 Panchagni (1986)
 Atham Chithira Chothi (1986) as Panikkar 
 Adiverukal (1986)
 Kayyum Thalayum Purathidaruthu (1985)
 Vellam (1985)
 Anubandham (1985)
 Sreekrishna Parunthu (1984)
 NH 47 (1984)
 Surumayitta Kannukal (1983)
 Iniyenkilum (1983) as Nanu Ashari
 Kanmanikkorumma (1982)
 Ahimsa (1982)
 Ankuram (1982)
 Ee Nadu (1982) as Beeran
 Chaappa (1982)
 Ilaneer (1981)
 Greeshmajwaala (1981) as Varkey
 Angadi (1980)
 Vilkkanundu Swapnangal (1980)
 Lava (1980) as Kumaran
 Chakara (1980) as Shankaran Master
 Anyarude Bhoomi (1979)
 Bandhanam (1978)
 Uttarayanam (1975)
 Udayam Kizhakku Thanne (1978)
 Sthanarthi Saramma (1966) as Gopi Pilla
 Murappennu (1965) as Kuttappa Menon
 Aadya Kiranangal (1964) as Paappi
 Thacholi Othenan (1964) as Kandacheri Chappan
 Ammaye Kaanaan (1963) as Kuttayi
 Swargarajyam (1962)

References

External links

 Kunjandi at MSI
http://oldmalayalamcinema.wordpress.com/2011/01/06/remembering-m-kunjandi-9-years-on/
http://entertainment.oneindia.in/celebs/kunjandi/filmography.html

1919 births
2002 deaths
Indian male film actors
Male actors from Kozhikode
Male actors in Malayalam cinema
20th-century Indian male actors
Recipients of the Kerala Sangeetha Nataka Akademi Fellowship
Recipients of the Kerala Sangeetha Nataka Akademi Award